The Big West Conference (BWC) is an American collegiate athletic conference whose member institutions participate in the National Collegiate Athletic Association's Division I. The conference was originally formed on July 1, 1969, as the Pacific Coast Athletic Association (PCAA), and in 1988 was renamed the Big West Conference. The conference stopped sponsoring college football after the 2000 season.

Among the conference's 11 member institutions, 10 are located in California (with 9 located in Southern California alone) and one is located in Hawaii. All of the schools are public universities, with the California schools evenly split between the California State University and the University of California systems. In addition, one affiliate member plays two sports in the BWC not sponsored by its home conference.

History

Pacific Coast Athletic Association
The Big West Conference was formed in June 1968 as the Pacific Coast Athletic Association.  The five original charter members were Fresno State, San Jose State, UC Santa Barbara, San Diego State, and Long Beach State.  Two other schools, Cal State Los Angeles and the University of the Pacific, were also considered but they declined at that time to pursue membership.  The newly formed conference had a number of meetings to set up its governance, which was confirmed in October 1968 on the campus of UC Santa Barbara.  Before the league started play, Cal State Los Angeles joined as a full member and the University of the Pacific joined for football only, becoming a full member itself two years later.  The conference itself lists July 1, 1969, as its founding date, with the seven institutions beginning conference play that fall.

Evolution
Since its inception as the Pacific Coast Athletic Association, the conference has seen many changes. Utah State was the first institution outside of California to join the conference in 1978. This opened the floodgates for many other schools to affiliate with the PCAA; notable schools include UNLV, Nevada, Louisiana Tech, Boise State, and football-only members, such as Southwestern Louisiana and Arkansas State.

In 1983, the PCAA became the first western conference to introduce women's athletic programs, allowing its female student-athletes to compete at the same level as their male counterparts. This proved vital for Hawaiʻi as their only participation in the conference was for their women's sports.

However, many universities left to join conferences that were perceived as more well-known, such as the Western Athletic Conference or the Mountain West Conference, while others did not see the benefit of travel since historically many of the teams have been California-based.

From the departures of Idaho and Utah State in 2005 until the arrival of Hawaii in 2012, all members were based in California, reducing the cost and travel time between the universities. When Hawaii joined, it agreed to help defray a portion of travel costs to that state for the league's California members.

There have been no fewer than 25 full and associate members in the conference's history, while only two of the original seven charter members remain (Long Beach State and UC Santa Barbara, with only Long Beach State's membership being continuous).

The change to the Big West

Effective July 1, 1988, the Pacific Coast Athletic Association changed its name to the Big West Conference.  With such schools as Utah State, UNLV, Nevada, New Mexico State, and Hawaii now in the fold, the name change was more representative of its member institutions.  In addition, the conference had signed a contract with ESPN to have its men's basketball games telecast as the third game of a triple header known as Big Monday - the other conferences being featured were the Big East and the Big Ten so the name Big West fit the theme.

Member schools

Current members

Full members

Notes

Affiliate members

Notes

Former members
Many of the former members of the Big West are now members of the Western Athletic Conference or the Mountain West Conference. Of the nine schools that were in the WAC before its early-2010s realignment, only Hawaii had not spent some time in the Big West as a football participant – it was a Big West member only in women's sports. Of the former members, Cal State Los Angeles is the only team that reverted to Division II level.

School names and nicknames reflect those used by the institutions when they were Big West members. One school has changed its name (Southwestern Louisiana, now branded athletically as Louisiana and also known as Louisiana–Lafayette) and one its nickname (Arkansas State, from Indians to Red Wolves).

Former full members

Former affiliate members

Former football-only members

Notes

Membership timeline

     

Notes
 San Diego State played football as an independent for the 1976 and 1977 seasons prior to leaving the Big West Conference in 1978.
 UC Santa Barbara was an independent from 1974–75 to 1975–76.
 Cal State Fullerton played football as an independent for the 1992 season and dropped football entirely the following year.
 Louisiana Tech, Northern Illinois, Southwestern Louisiana, and Arkansas State joined the Big West for a short-lived football consortium from 1993 to 1995.
 Arkansas State played football as an independent from 1996 to 1998 and then rejoined the Big West for football during the 1999 and 2000 seasons.

Sports
The Big West Conference currently sponsors 18 NCAA sports, with men's volleyball the newest addition for the 2017–18 school year.

In baseball, Cal State Fullerton has won four College World Series titles with national championships in 1979, 1984, 1995, and 2004. In addition, Long Beach State and UC Irvine have made multiple appearances in the College World Series. Fullerton also has a national championship in softball, winning in 1984. Long Beach State has won three NCAA women's volleyball titles, as a part of Big West Conference women's volleyball, with national championships in 1989, 1993, and 1998. Misty May-Treanor led the 49ers (now known as Beach) to a 36–0 record en route to the program's most recent title. UC Santa Barbara was the NCAA men's soccer runner-up in 2004, losing the national championship match to Indiana on penalty kicks. The Gauchos returned to the College Cup in 2006 and won the national championship.

Former Big West members UNLV and Pacific won national championships while part of the conference. The UNLV Runnin' Rebels men's basketball team won the 1990 NCAA tournament championship after routing Duke 103-73 in the national title game. UNLV was undefeated during the 1991 NCAA men's basketball season before falling to Duke in the final four. The Runnin' Rebels during this era are widely considered one of the best college basketball teams of all time. The Pacific Tigers women's volleyball team won back-to-back national championships in 1985 and 1986.

The Big West did not sponsor men's volleyball or men's water polo, but it was the primary conference affiliation of several schools that compete in the Mountain Pacific Sports Federation for these sports, respectively. In NCAA men's volleyball, UC Irvine has established itself as one of the nation's most elite programs, winning four national championships in 2007, 2009, 2012, and 2013. Long Beach State also won men's national volleyball titles in 1991, 2018 and 2019. In NCAA men's water polo, UC Irvine won three national championships in 1970, 1982, and 1989. UC Santa Barbara also won a men's water polo title in 1979.

On May 31, 2016, the Big West announced the conference would sponsor men's volleyball as its 18th sport, with five Big West schools leaving the MPSF to establish the new men's volleyball league. Men's volleyball is the third of four sports in which the MPSF has recently seen a mass exodus of teams to join an existing conference in a newly sponsored sport, with men's soccer, men's water polo, and women's lacrosse as the others. The men's volleyball membership includes core Big West members Cal State Northridge, Long Beach State, Hawaii, UC Irvine, and UC Santa Barbara. UC San Diego joined as an affiliate to bring the league to the NCAA minimum requirement of 6 teams to receive an automatic bid for the NCAA tournament.

Big West Commissioner Dennis Farrell explained that adding UC San Diego was not an indicator UC San Diego would be added to the Big West Conference as a full member. UC San Diego had recently passed a bill to move all their sports to Division I and was looking for an invite from the Big West Conference. UC San Diego has long competed at the Division I level in men's volleyball; the NCAA conducts a single national championship open to all Division I and II members, and scholarship limits in the sport are the same in both divisions. The Big West regular season for men's volleyball will be double round-robin, each team playing the others once at home and once on the road. The Big West Tournament will have all six teams participate in single-elimination rounds with the top two teams receiving semifinal byes.

The Big West is the first Division I all-sports conference (defined as a league that sponsors men's and women's basketball) ever to sponsor men's volleyball, and the second NCAA all-sports conference overall to sponsor men's volleyball as a scholarship sport (the first was the Division II Conference Carolinas).

On November 26, 2017 the Big West announced that it would add UC San Diego along with Cal State Bakersfield as its 10th and 11th members starting on July 1, 2020. Cal State Bakersfield, which was already a full Division I member competing in the Western Athletic Conference, became a full member effective July 1, 2020. UC San Diego, which had failed to move up from Division II in failed bids to the Big West in 2011 and April 2017, has begun the four-year transition process to Division I and will become a full member effective July 1, 2024. UC San Diego's men's volleyball joined the Big West in 2017, in advance of that sport's 2018 season, and women's water polo joined in 2019. Because the NCAA does not sponsor a Division II championship in either men's volleyball or women's water polo, UCSD was eligible for conference championships in both sports upon joining the Big West, and will remain eligible for such during the D-I transition.

UC San Diego and Cal State Bakersfield officially joined the conference on July 1, 2020 and Dan Butterly became the new commissioner following the retirement of Dennis Farrell.

Men's sponsored sports by school

Women's sponsored sports by school

Former sports

Football
An asterisk denotes the participant in the bowls that invited the Big West champion: Pasadena (1969–70), California (1981–91), Las Vegas (1992–96), and Humanitarian (1997–2000)

The Big West Conference discontinued football following the 2000 season.

Facilities

Commissioner's Cup 
Started during the Big West Conference's 1998–99 season, the Commissioner's Cup is awarded yearly to the most outstanding program over the course of the season in the conference's sponsored sports.  The UC Santa Barbara Gauchos are the most successful team to date having won 10 total trophies.

Overall Commissioner's Cups Table

Note 1: Bold indicates current members of the Big West Conference

Note 2: The Pacific Tigers moved to the West Coast Conference in 2013

So Cal Challenge 
Since 2021, the Big West Conference has served as host of the So Cal Challenge, an eight-team men's basketball tournament held during Monday and Wednesday of Thanksgiving week. One Big West team represents the conference in the field of each tournament. Cal Poly and Cal State Northridge participated in 2021 and 2022, respectively.

See also
 Big West Conference men's basketball tournament
 Big West Conference women's basketball tournament
 List of Big West Conference baseball champions

References

External links
 

 
Sports organizations established in 1969
Articles which contain graphical timelines